Geo Wyex, fka Geo Wyeth (born 1984) is a transgender mixed-race, black American  musician and performance artist known for songs, performances and soundscapes works that explore, augment, and reimagine the material articulations and embodiments of absence.  His work often features characters, outcasts and alienated trans / queer subjects, and the cosomologies that come out of such positionality. Based in Rotterdam, the Netherlands (2017)

Early life and education
Geo Wyex was born in New York, New York in 1984 and grew up in Hell's Kitchen New York City and Montclair, New Jersey. He received a BA from Yale University.

Work
Wyex's work combines installation, music and performance in which handmade sets and unusual costumes join with absurd storytelling in performances that break down the boundaries between the audience and the performer and create an experience of communal intimacy.

Awards and Fellowships
Among the honors which Geo Wyex has earned are: 
Dolf Henkes Prijs Rotterdam, NL -(2021)
Mondriaan Fonds Deltaworkers Residency (2019)
Rijksakademie van beeldende kunsten Residency (2015)
Art Matters Foundation Grant (2012)
Jerome Foundation Travel and Research Grant (2011)

Selected Performances
Wyex has presented performances at art institutions including MoMA PS1, The Stedelijk Museum Amsterdam, The New Museum, LA MoCA.

Solo performances / projects:
 2018 - I'm A Chip/Make This Music Disappear - Buda Kunstencentrum, Kortrijk, NLD
 2017 - Juice CrosxxxSing - The New Museum, New York City, USA
 2016 - Storm Excellent Salad - MoMA PS1, New York City, USA

References

External links

 Geo Wyeth Interview in Huffington Post

1984 births
American performance artists
American LGBT artists
Queer artists
Transgender artists
Living people
Yale University alumni
American contemporary artists
21st-century American artists
Artists from New York City